Avenida 8 de Octubre is one of the main thoroughfares of Montevideo, Uruguay, extending 3.5 miles (5.6 km) from Tres Cruces at the intersection with 18 de Julio Avenue to Maroñas, where it turns into Camino Maldonado.

After extending for 250 m, it passes under Artigas Boulevard through a 300 m tunnel, and rises to the surface between Avelino Miranda and Presidente Batlle streets. Extended through La Blanqueada, Unión, and Maroñas, a large number of shops, public institutions, educational centers and hospitals are concentrated on this avenue.

History 
By decree of December 20, 1866, during the administration of Venancio Flores, it was named Camino 8 de Octubre. The name comes from the date on which the peace that ended the Uruguayan Civil War was signed, on October 8, 1851. In the 1860s, the paving of the road was carried out from the current Plaza del Gaucho to what was then Montevideo Street (current Pernas St.). The paving works finished on July 14, 1867.

By decree of November 4, 1867, the section of the old Camino a Maldonado between El Gaucho and Tres Cruces that was known as Camino a La Unión, adopted the name of July 18, extending the main throughfare of Montevideo until it joined the October 8 road. In 1919, due to a modification in the layout of Avenida 18 de Julio, a sector of it was incorporated into 8 de Octubre Avenue, giving it its current extension. In 1925 the original cobblestone was replaced by concrete. 

On July 18, 1961, the tunnel that passes under the Democracy Square and Artigas Boulevard was inaugurated.

Landmarks 
The main landmarks along this avenue are:

Catholic University of Uruguay
Médica Uruguaya Center
Sanguinetti Primary School
Geographic Military Institute

Gallery

References 

Tres Cruces
La Blanqueada
Unión, Montevideo
Streets in Montevideo